Manfred Horvath (born 1960) is an Austrian former cyclist. He won the Austrian National Road Race Championships in 1979.

References

External links
 

1960 births
Living people
Austrian male cyclists
Sportspeople from Lower Austria